Christianus Carolus Henricus van der Aa (25 August 1718 – 23 September 1793) was a Lutheran pastor in Haarlem and secretary of the Royal Holland Society of Sciences and Humanities.

Life 
Christianus Carolus Henricus was born in Zwolle, where his father Balduinus also worked as a pastor.

He studied theology first in Leiden, and later in Jena. On 22 March 1739 he became a Lutheran pastor in Alkmaar, then on August 12, 1742, become a preacher in Haarlem (he had previously been twice, thanks to a job in Gouda).

In Haarlem, at the creation of the Royal Holland Society of Sciences and Humanities in 1752, where he would play a major role, he was appointed as secretary. Thanks to this he entered into two equally honourable positions, namely at The Hague in 1755 and later in Batavia, Dutch East Indies. He died in the night from 22 to 23 September 1793 in Haarlem.

Several of his sermons have appeared in print.

Works 
 Verhandelingen over den aart van het gebed, in 32 bedestonden, Haarlem, 1747. (2nd edition, 1793)
 Een-en-twintig Predikatiën over gewigtige onderwerpen, Haarlem, 1748 (2nd edition, 1784)
 Onderzoek der hoofdoogmerken van onzen Heer J.C., in eenige der voornaamste gevallen zijns levens, Haarlem, 1755. (2nd edition, 1793)
 Vier Predikatiën gehouden te Schiedam, bij gelegenheid van de oprigting dier gemeente enz., Haarlem, 1758, 8°. (2nd edition, 1793)
 De Mensch als Gods beeld beschouwd, Haarlem, 1769.
 Leerrede over II. Cor. V. vs. 20: ter bevestiging van Ds. P.A. Hulsbeek, Haarlem, 1784.
 Aanspraak in het Luthersche Weeshuis te Haarlem, den 20 Januarij 1789, bij de viering der vijftigste verjaring van dat Godshuis.
 De vereischte van ware godsvrucht, om Gods beeld op aarde te wezen. Haarlem 1792.
  's Menschen ingang tot heerlijkheid, om in het toekomende leven Gods beeld in volkomenheid te wezen, 3 dln., Haarlem, 1792.
 Leerrede over II Petri I. vs. 12-14, ter gedachtenis van zijnen 50jarigen Predikdienst bij de gemeente te Haarlem, 1792.

References 
 art. Aa (Christianus Carolus Henricus van der), in A.J. van der Aa, Biographisch woordenboek der Nederlanden. Deel 1, Haarlem, 1852, pp. 1-3.
 art. Aa (Christianus Carolus Henricus v. d.), in S. de Bruin, Geographisch-historisch woordenboek. Deel 1: A-G, Leiden, 1869, p. 2-3.
 J.W. Pont, art. Aa (Christianus Carolus Henricus van der), in P.C. Molhuysen - P.J. Blok (edd.), Nieuw Nederlandsch biografisch woordenboek. Deel 1, Leiden, 1911, p. 2.

External links 
 Image (GeheugenvanNederland.nl) (in Dutch)
 Biography, works and texts at the Digitale Bibliotheek voor de Nederlandse Letteren (dbnl) (in Dutch)

1718 births
1793 deaths
18th-century Dutch people
18th-century Lutheran clergy
Dutch Protestant ministers and clergy
Leiden University alumni
Members of the Koninklijke Hollandsche Maatschappij der Wetenschappen
People from Zwolle
University of Jena alumni